This is a list of collegiate a cappella groups in the United States.

References

 
Collegiate a cappella